is a Japanese voice actress and singer employed by 81 Produce who is most known for voicing Sailor Jupiter in the original Japanese anime of Sailor Moon and Kushina Uzumaki in Naruto: Shippuden. She was born in Fukushima Prefecture and raised in Nagano.  She is married to tokusatsu actor Hiroshi Watari.

Voice roles
Elizabeth in Dream Hunter Rem (Debut Role 1986)
B-Ko Daitokuji in Project A-Ko (1986)
Kekko Kamen in Kekko Kamen (1991)
Kyurene (ep. 6), Jumeau (ep. 18), Makoto Kino/Sailor Jupiter (eps. 25 - 200), DD Girls V (ep. 45) in Pretty Soldier Sailor Moon (1992-1997)
Mirei in Tokyo Babylon (1992)
Kanako (Kana-chan) in Miracle Girls (1993)
Isabelle in Moldiver (1993)
Kagero in Ninja Scroll (1993)
Makoto Kino/Sailor Jupiter in Pretty Soldier Sailor Moon R The Movie (1993)
Mokuren in Please Save My Earth (1993)
Presea and Sierra in Magic Knight Rayearth (1994)
Makoto Kino/Sailor Jupiter in Pretty Soldier Sailor Moon S The Movie (1994)
The Mad Hatter in Miyuki-chan in Wonderland (1995)
Makoto Kino/Sailor Jupiter in The 9 Sailor Soldiers Get Together! Miracle in the Black Dream Hole (1995)
April O'Neil in Mutant Turtles: Superman Legend (1996)
 Ruiko Sakuragi in Kindaichi Case Files (1997 series ep 1)
Eri Ochiai in Perfect Blue (1997)
Kaho Mizuki in Cardcaptor Sakura (1998)
Yayoi Matsunaga in Nightwalker (1998)
Kaho Mizuki in Cardcaptor Sakura Movie 2: The Sealed Card (2000)
Katsuna Asamiya in Bleach (2004)
Kushina Uzumaki in Naruto: Shippuden (2007)
Kaho Mizuki in Cardcaptor Sakura: Clear Card (2018)
Sachiko Hinode in A Whisker Away (2020)

Unknown date 
Prince Tapioca in Princess Quest
Yōko Mizuno in Maria-sama ga Miteru
Xia Yu Fan in Full Metal Panic! The Second Raid
Mitsuko Aida  in Honey and Clover
Karei Hirozaki in Maburaho
Shizuka Namio in Space Pirate Captain Herlock ova
Maria Pia Armonia in Mobile Suit Victory Gundam
Tennyo Masaki in Tenchi Muyo! (OVA 3)
Mirage Koas in Star Ocean: Till the End of Time
Namiko Todaka in Hell Girl
Agarte Lindblum in Tales of Rebirth
Ms. Sakagami in Nana
Ophelia in Claymore
V.E in Summon Night Craft Sword Monogatari: Hajimari no Ishi
Tsubura Ise in Ayakashi Ninden Kunoichiban (PlayStation game)
Carrera Marker in Karin
Dr. Gilliam in Appleseed (2004 movie)
Angel in The Big O
Princess Mehm in UFO Ultramaiden Valkyrie
Natsuhi Ushiromiya in Umineko no Naku Koro ni
Azalie Cait Sith in Sorcerous Stabber Orphen
Misuzu Misaka in Toaru Majutsu no Index II
Shizuko Aoki in Smile PreCure!
Mrs. Katsura Hayate the Combat Butler
Michiru Satomi Immortal Grand Prix
Chizuru Toomi in Fafner in the Azure
Masumi Kaido in Go! Princess PreCure

Tokusatsu

Captain Stick in B-Robo Kabutack (1997)
Hielahiela (ep. 28) in Seijuu Sentai Gingaman (1998)
Pretty-Girl Ninja Furabijennu (ep. 30) in Ninpuu Sentai Hurricanger (2002)
Burstosaur Pteranodon in Bakuryū Sentai Abaranger (2003)
Burstosaur Pteranodon in Bakuryū Sentai Abaranger DELUXE: Abare Summer is Freezing Cold! (2003)
Burstosaur Pteranodon in Bakuryū Sentai Abaranger vs. Hurricaneger (2003)
Burstosaur Pteranodon in Tokusou Sentai Dekaranger vs. Abaranger (2004) 
Jergonian Sukeela (ep. 49 – 50) in Tokusou Sentai Dekaranger (2004)
Medusa Legendorga in Kamen Rider Kiva: King of the Castle in the Demon World (2008)

Video games
Agarte Lindblum in Tales of Rebirth
Barbara in Romancing SaGa
Cindy Gibson in Ray Tracers
Kushina Uzumaki in Naruto Shippuden: Ultimate Ninja Storm 3
Kushina Uzumaki in Naruto Shippuden: Ultimate Ninja Storm Revolution
Mari Iimura in Victorious Boxers: Revolution'
Mary Nenem Kinoshita in Mabino X StyleMarveille Million in Solatorobo: Red the HunterMirage Koas in Star Ocean: Till the End of TimeNebula in Stella Deus: The Gate of EternityPanther Risako and Royal Hojo in Wrestle Angels: SurvivorPanther Risako and Royal Hojo in Wrestle Angels: Survivor 2Sailor Jupiter in Sailor Moon series
Sayori Yukizuki in Snow PortableZoey the Fairy in Spyro 2: Ripto's Rage!Dubbing
Live-action54 – Anita Randazzo (Salma Hayek)Black Beauty – Mrs. Winthorp (Claire Forlani)Blackjack – Cinder James (Kam Heskin)Charlie and the Chocolate Factory (2008 NTV edition) – Mrs. Beauregarde (Missi Pyle)The Comebacks – Barb Fields (Melora Hardin)Hollow Man – Dr. Sarah Kennedy (Kim Dickens)Léon: The Professional (1996 TV Asahi edition) – Mathilda Lando (Natalie Portman)Melinda and Melinda – Laurel (Chloë Sevigny)Rumble in the Bronx – Nancy (Françoise Yip)Teenage Mutant Ninja Turtles III – April O'Neil (Paige Turco)The Golden Bowl – Charlotte Stant (Uma Thurman)The Guest – Laura Peterson (Sheila Kelley)The Wizard of Oz — Dorothy Gale (Judy Garland)Trainspotting – Diane Coulston (Kelly Macdonald)T2 Trainspotting – Diane Coulston (Kelly Macdonald)

Animation101 Dalmatians: The Series – PerditaAnimaniacs – RitaBatman: The Animated Series – Francine Langstrom, Grace LamontLooney Tunes – Penelope PussycatTeenage Mutant Ninja Turtles (TV Tokyo Version) – April O'NeilTeenage Mutant Ninja Turtles – Mrs. O'NeilThe Simpsons – Lurleen LumpkinTiny Toon Adventures – Flassie, TerryX-Men'' (TV Tokyo Version) – Polaris

References

External links
 81 Produce
 

1963 births
81 Produce voice actors
Japanese video game actresses
Japanese voice actresses
Living people
Voice actresses from Fukushima Prefecture
Musicians from Fukushima Prefecture
Anime musicians
People from Nagano (city)
Voice actresses from Nagano Prefecture
20th-century Japanese actresses
21st-century Japanese actresses
20th-century Japanese women singers
20th-century Japanese singers
21st-century Japanese women singers
21st-century Japanese singers